The 1996 Georgia Tech Yellow Jackets football team represented the Georgia Institute of Technology in the 1996 NCAA Division I-A football season. The team's coach was George O'Leary. Tech played its home games at Bobby Dodd Stadium in Atlanta.

Schedule

Roster

References

Georgia Tech
Georgia Tech Yellow Jackets football seasons
Georgia Tech Yellow Jackets football